Jack Bertrand Weinstein (August 10, 1921 – June 15, 2021) was a United States district judge of the United States District Court for the Eastern District of New York. Until his entry into inactive senior status on February 10, 2020, he maintained a full docket of cases.

Early life, education and military service

Weinstein was born on August 10, 1921, into a Jewish family living temporarily in Wichita, Kansas, the son of Harry and Bessie (Brodach) Weinstein. He was raised partly in Brooklyn, New York. He graduated from Abraham Lincoln High School in Brooklyn's Brighton Beach district before receiving a Bachelor of Arts degree from Brooklyn College in 1943. During World War II, he served as a lieutenant in the United States Navy from 1943 to 1946. His duties included serving as deck officer on board the submarine USS Jallao, where he also ran the radar equipment. He graduated from Columbia Law School with a Bachelor of Laws degree in 1948.

Early legal career

After law school he worked for the NAACP Legal Defense Fund, was a member of the litigation team for Brown v. Board of Education, and worked on the "one man, one vote" litigation of the 1960s. His collaborators included future Columbia Law School colleagues such as Charles Black and Jack Greenberg. He was a law clerk for Justice Stanley Fuld of the New York State Court of Appeals, from 1949 to 1950. He also worked for Republican State Senator Seymour Halpern. While on the faculty of Columbia Law School, he was county attorney of Nassau County, New York from 1955 to 1957.

Federal judicial service

On January 16, 1967, he was nominated as a federal judge to the United States District Court for the Eastern District of New York, to a seat vacated by Judge Leo F. Rayfiel. He was confirmed by the United States Senate on April 14, 1967, and received his commission on April 15, 1967. He served as Chief Judge from 1980 to 1988.

As a federal judge, he has worked with a number of mass tort cases, including those relating to Agent Orange, asbestos, tobacco, breast implants, diethylstilbestrol, Zyprexa, and handguns. He has been known to take on large numbers of cases from other judges, and on one occasion collected most of the unresolved habeas corpus petitions in the Eastern District to bring finality to the claims of many prisoners. Weinstein took senior status on March 1, 1993, but had maintained a full docket of cases since then and continued to do so until he entered into inactive senior status on February 10, 2020. His change to inactive senior status meant that while he remained a federal judge, he no longer heard cases or participated in the business of the court.

Academic service
Following two years in private practice, Weinstein was a tenured professor at Columbia Law School from 1952 until commencing his judicial service in 1967. He remained on the institution's faculty as an adjunct professor until 1998. From 1987 until his death, he was an adjunct professor at Brooklyn Law School.

Cases
The Second Circuit Appeals court reversed Weinstein's ruling in favor of the City of New York (Mayor Michael Bloomberg) against a group of gun manufacturers.  The Second Circuit found the suit to be barred under Protection of Lawful Commerce in Arms Act (PLCAA).  From the decision of April 30, 2008; "We conclude that the City's claim, predicated on New York Penal Law § 240.45, does not fall within an exception to the claim restricting provisions of the Act because that statute does not fall within the contours of the Act's predicate exception. We also hold that the PLCAA is a valid exercise of the powers granted to Congress pursuant to the Commerce Clause and that the PLCAA does not violate the doctrine of separation of powers or  otherwise offend the Constitution in any manner alleged by the City."

In March 2005, Weinstein dismissed a lawsuit filed by the Vietnamese victims of Agent Orange against producers of chemicals defoliants/herbicides on the grounds that use of the herbicide in warfare had been legal under the international law of the time.

According to a May 2010 New York Times article, Weinstein entered the national debate regarding child pornography laws by issuing a "series of rulings that directly attack the mandatory five-year prison sentence faced by defendants charged with receiving child pornography."

Between 2006 and 2007, Weinstein presided over a case involving the dissemination of Eli Lilly internal documents relating to the drug Zyprexa.  Zyprexa was the subject of litigation in which the plaintiffs alleged that Eli Lilly had downplayed certain side effects associated with Zyprexa. An anonymous "citizen-journalist" initially released the internal documents on the public Internet before Weinstein issued an order blocking publication of material that would "facilitate dissemination" of the documents.

In August 2017, Weinstein amended his rule sheet to encourage junior female lawyers to take a speaking role in his courtroom. In October 2017, Weinstein threatened to hold a dedicated hearing on police perjury after allowing allegations to go to trial that police officers had falsely arrested a cashier simply to claim overtime.

In December 2017, Weinstein sentenced three gang members to up to eight years in prison for robbing at gunpoint a family and their five young children inside their home.  In his statement of reasons for the sentence, however, Weinstein criticized mandatory sentencing for unjustly punishing the perpetrators as "society's unredeemables".  On June 11, 2018, Weinstein explicitly criticized recent Supreme Court precedent when he refused to grant qualified immunity to police officers who had allegedly beaten a resident when he tried to stop them from entering his home without a warrant.

Death
Weinstein died on June 15, 2021 in Great Neck, New York (where he resided for most of his adult life) at the age of 99.

Publications

Weinstein's publications include leading treatises on evidence and New York practice.  He has also written a number of law review articles (not included below) and several books.

Individual Justice in Mass Tort Litigation: The Effect of Class Actions, Consolidations, and Other Multiparty Devices (1995)

Mass Torts:Cases and Materials (with Kenneth Feinberg) (1992)

Chapter VIII - Rulemaking by the Courts: The Judicial Administration Division Handbook, A.B.A. (6th ed., 1981)

Reform of the Court Rulemaking Procedures, The Institute of Comparative Law in Japan (Japanese ed., 1981)

Reform of the Federal Rulemaking Process (Ohio State Univ. Press, 1977)

Basic Problems of State and Federal Evidence (by Edward R. Morgan), 5th ed. Weinstein Rev., (1976)

Weinstein's Evidence (with Prof. Margaret Berger), 7 Volumes, 1975–1979, With Annual Supplements, One Volume, 1987, With Annual Supplements

Cases and Materials on Evidence (with Morgan and Maguire) 1957, (with Maguire, Chadbourn & Mansfield, 1964, 1970, 1973) (with Mansfield, Berger & Abrams, 1981, 1988)

Rules and Statute Supplement (with Mansfield, Abrams & Berger, 1981, 1982, 1987)

Elements of Civil Procedure (with Rosenberg, 1962) (with Rosenberg & Smith, 1970)
(1982 Supplement 3rd ed. (with Rosenberg, Smith & Korn))

New York Civil Procedure (with Korn & Miller) 7 Volumes (1976)

Manual of New York Civil Procedure (with Korn & Miller) (1967)

Essays on the New York Constitution (1966)

A New York Constitution Meeting Today's Needs and Tomorrow's Challenges, March (1967)

Various New York Practice Annual Publications (Editor) (1960)

See also
List of Jewish American jurists
List of United States federal judges by longevity of service

References

External links
 

1921 births
2021 deaths
20th-century American judges
20th-century American naval officers
21st-century American judges
Abraham Lincoln High School (Brooklyn) alumni
American people of Jewish descent
Brooklyn College alumni
Brooklyn Law School faculty
Columbia Law School alumni
Columbia Law School faculty
Judges of the United States District Court for the Eastern District of New York
Military personnel from Kansas
People from Wichita, Kansas
Scholars of evidence law
United States district court judges appointed by Lyndon B. Johnson
United States Navy personnel of World War II